One More Time is a 2015 drama film written and directed by Robert Edwards. The film stars Christopher Walken, Amber Heard, Kelli Garner, Hamish Linklater, Ann Magnuson and Oliver Platt. The film was released on April 8, 2016, by Starz Digital.

Plot
Jude (Amber Heard) is a young, struggling singer-songwriter who leaves New York City to visit her father Paul (Christopher Walken), an old crooner trying to make a musical comeback, and their dysfunctional family in the Hamptons.

Cast
 Christopher Walken as Paul Francis Lippman / Paul Lombard
 Amber Heard as Jude Lippman / Starshadow Lombard
 Kelli Garner as Corinne Lombard Sanderson
 Hamish Linklater as Tim Sanderson
 Ann Magnuson as Lucille Lombard
 Oliver Platt as Alan Sternberg
 David Kelemen as David Sanderson
 Sandra Berrios as Lourdes, The Maid
 Gavin McInnes as Record Producer

Production
In October 2014, Deadline Hollywood announced that Oliver Simon and Daniel Baur from K5 International would executive produce with Lars Knudsen and Jay Van Hoy from Parts & Labor, Chris Maybach, Saemi and Saerom Kim with Maybach Film Productions, and Ferne Pearlstein and Lucas Joaquin all producing. Filming took place in East Hampton, New York; and New York City.

Release
The film was released on April 8, 2016, by Starz Digital.

References

External links
 
 
 

2010s English-language films
2010s American films
2015 films
2015 drama films
American drama films
Films about father–daughter relationships
Films about singers
Films shot in New York (state)
Films shot in New York City